Armando Testa (23 March 1917 – 20 March 1992) was an Italian graphic designer, cartoonist, animator and painter.

Born in Turin, Testa worked as a typesetter until 20 years old. He was initiated to artistic career by abstract painter Ezio D'Errico, who was one of his professors at the Vigliardi-Paravia Printing School  he attended. After winning a poster design contest in 1937, he started working in the advertising industry, and in 1946 abandoned his work as a printer and opened a graphic studio in his hometown. In 1956, he founded Studio Armando Testa  along with his wife, Lidia, and associate Franco de Barberis, and their  studio soon became one of Italy's largest agencies,  partnering with Benton & Bowles in the United States and establishing several branches throughout Europe. A key role in Testa's success had television commercials, particularly the ones created for Carosello. In 1959 he created the official logo for 1960 Summer Olympics. Studio Armando Testa's customers include Nestlé, Lavazza and  Barilla.

Between 1965 and 1971, he was professor of Design and Typographic Composition at the Polytechnic University of Turin.

He was granted the Gold Medal of the Ministry of Education for his contribution to Visual Art in 1968.

Starting from the mid-1980s, Testa focused on painting and on poster design for cultural and social campaigns. In 1985 he was appointed honor laureate in Fort Collins, Colorado.

At the 66th edition  of the Venice Film Festival, in September 2009, it was presented out of competition a biographical documentary film, Armando Testa - povero ma moderno directed by Pappi Corsicato.

In 1978, the Studio Testa transformed to the Armando Testa Spa. They expanded their operations to Milan and Rome, as well.

See also
 History of advertising#Italy

References

External links  
 

1917 births
1992 deaths
Artists from Turin
Italian graphic designers
Italian advertising executives
20th-century Italian painters
Italian male painters
20th-century Italian male artists
Academic staff of the Polytechnic University of Turin
Typesetters